Denbighshire is a county in the north-east of Wales. Its borders differ from the historic county of the same name. This part of Wales contains the country's oldest known evidence of habitation – Pontnewydd (Bontnewydd-Llanelwy) Palaeolithic site has Neanderthal remains of some 225,000 years ago. Castles include Denbigh, Rhuddlan, Rhyl, Prestatyn, Trefnant, Llangollen and Ruthin, Castell Dinas Bran, Bodelwyddan and St Asaph Cathedral.

Denbighshire is bounded by coastline to the north and hills to the east, south and west. The River Clwyd follows a broad valley with little industry: crops appear in the Vale of Clwyd and cattle and sheep in the uplands. The coast attracts summer visitors; hikers frequent the Clwydian Range, part of the Clwydian Range and Dee Valley Area of Outstanding Natural Beauty. Llangollen International Musical Eisteddfod takes place each July.

Formation
The main area was formed on 1 April 1996 under the Local Government (Wales) Act 1994, from various parts of the county of Clwyd. It includes the district of Rhuddlan (formed in 1974 entirely from Flintshire), the communities of Trefnant and Cefn Meiriadog from the district of Colwyn (entirely Denbighshire) and most of the Glyndŵr district. The last includes the former Edeyrnion Rural District, part of the administrative county of Merionethshire before 1974, covering the parishes of Betws Gwerfil Goch, Corwen, Gwyddelwern, Llangar, Llandrillo yn Edeirnion and Llansanffraid.

Other principal areas including part of historical Denbighshire are Conwy, which picked up the remainder of 1974–1996 Colwyn, the Denbighshire parts of 1974–1996 Aberconwy, and Wrexham, which corresponds to the pre-1974 borough of Wrexham along with most of Wrexham Rural District and several parishes of Glyndŵr. Post-1996 Powys includes the historically Denbighshire parishes of Llanrhaeadr-ym-Mochnant, Llansilin and Llangedwyn, which formed part of Glyndŵr district.

Early history
Researchers have found signs that Denbighshire was inhabited at least 225,000 years ago. Bontnewydd Palaeolithic site is one of the most significant in Britain. Hominid remains of probable Neanderthals have been found, along with stone tools from the later Middle Pleistocene.

Archaeology
In 2021 February, archaeologists from Aeon Archaeology announced a discovery of over 300 Stone Age tools and artifacts in Rhuddlan. They revealed scrapers, microliths, flakes of chert (a hard, fine-grained, sedimentary rock composed of microcrystalline or cryptocrystalline quartz), flints and other rudimentary tools. An expert, Richard Cooke, believes the lithic remains belonged to ancient peoples, who while passing through the area, made camp by the river more than 9,000 years ago.

Geography
See also List of places in Denbighshire.
The eastern edge of Denbighshire follows the ridge of the Clwydian Range, with a steep escarpment to the west and a high point at Moel Famau, which with the upper Dee Valley forms an Area of Outstanding Natural Beauty, the Clwydian Range and Dee Valley – one of just five in the Wales. The Denbigh Moors (Mynydd Hiraethog) are in the west of the county and the Berwyn Range adjacent to the southern edge. The River Clwyd has a broad fertile Vale running from south–north in the centre of the county. There is a narrow coastal plain in the north which much residential and holiday-trade development. The highest point in the historic county was Cadair Berwyn at ), but the boundary changes since 1974 make Cadair Berwyn North Top the highest point. Denbighshire borders the present-day principal areas of Gwynedd, Conwy County Borough, Flintshire, Wrexham County Borough, and Powys.

Population
According to the 2021 United Kingdom census, Denbighshire's population was approximately 95,800. According to previous censuses, the population size of Denbighshire was 93,734 in 2011 and 93,065 in 2001. The largest towns on the coast are Rhyl (2001 population c. 25,000) and Prestatyn (2001 population c. 18,000). According to the 2011 Census returns, 24.6 per cent stated they could speak Welsh.

Economy
Since the 20th-century demise of the coal and steel industries in the Wrexham area, there is no heavy industry in the county. Although most towns have small industrial parks or estates for light industry, the economy is based on agriculture and tourism. Much of the working population is employed in the service sector. The uplands support sheep and beef cattle rearing, while in the Vale of Clwyd dairy farming and wheat and barley crops predominate. Many towns have livestock markets and farming supports farm machinery merchants, vets, feed merchants, contractors and other ancillaries. With their incomes on the decline, farmers have found opportunities in tourism, rural crafts, specialist food shops, farmers' markets and value-added food products.

The upland areas with their sheep farms and small, stone-walled fields are attractive to visitors. Redundant farm buildings are often converted into self-catering accommodation, while many farmhouses supply bed and breakfast. The travel trade began with the arrival of the coast railway in the mid-19th century, opening up the area to Merseyside. This led to a boom in seaside guest houses. More recently, caravan sites and holiday villages have thrived and ownership of holiday homes increased. Initiatives to boost the economy of North Wales continue, including redevelopment of the Rhyl seafront and funfair.

Transport
The North Wales Coast Line running from Crewe to Holyhead is served by Transport for Wales and Avanti West Coast services. Trains leaving Crewe to pass through Chester, cross the River Dee into Wales, and continue through Flint, Shotton, Holywell Junction (closed in 1966), Prestatyn, Rhyl, and stations to Bangor and Holyhead, which has a ferry service to Ireland.

There are no motorways in Denbighshire. The A55 dual carriageway runs from Chester through St Asaph to the North Wales coast at Abergele, then parallel to the railway through Conwy and Bangor to Holyhead. The A548 run from Chester to Abergele through Deeside and along the coast, before leaving the coast and terminating at Llanrwst. The main road from London, the A5, passes north-westwards through Llangollen, Corwen and Betws-y-Coed to join the A55 and terminate at Bangor. The A543 crosses the Denbigh Moors from south-east to north-west, and the A525 links Ruthin with St Asaph.

There are local bus services between the main towns. Several services by Arriva Buses Wales run along the main coast road between Chester and Holyhead, linking the coastal resorts. Another route links Rhyl to Denbigh.

Politics
Denbighshire is represented in the House of Commons by three MPs. The Welsh Labour Party lost to the Welsh Conservatives in the 2019 general election for the first time.

The following MPs were elected from Denbighshire in 2019:
Simon Baynes (Welsh Conservatives) in Clwyd South, first elected in 2019.
David Jones (Welsh Conservatives) in Clwyd West, first elected in 2005.
James Davies (Welsh Conservatives) in Vale of Clwyd, first elected in 2019.

Denbighshire is also represented in the Senedd by three members elected in 2021:
Ken Skates (Welsh Labour) in Clwyd South, first elected in 2011
Darren Millar (Welsh Conservatives) in Clwyd West, first elected in 2007
Gareth Davies (Welsh Conservatives) in Vale of Clwyd, first elected in 2021.

In 2019, research by UnHerd in association with the pollster FocalData showed that most people across the county support the British monarchy.

See also
Denbighshire (historic)
List of Lord Lieutenants of Denbighshire
List of Custodes Rotulorum of Denbighshire
List of High Sheriffs of Denbighshire
Denbighshire (UK Parliament constituency)
List of places in Denbighshire
List of schools in Denbighshire

References

External links

 

Denbighshire landscape

Denbighshire
Counties of Wales
Principal areas of Wales
North Wales